Gemini Group, Inc. is a supplier of engineered plastic and metal products to OEM's and Tier 1 suppliers. The company operates internationally from its headquarters in Bad Axe, Michigan in the United States.

History
Gemini Group was established in 1972 by Bill Roberts and Frank Peplinski.

Initial business offerings included sewing seatbelts and blow molding seatbelt covers for automotive Tier 1 companies in the United States and Mexico.  When customers began moving operations to Mexico, the company diversified operations and a plastic extrusion division was born. 

In 1979, the company partnered with two precision machining companies and a production machining company to form a manufacturing alliance.

During the next two decades, the alliance continued to grow through the acquisition of a two-shot injection moulding company, the creation of a blow molding company, the development of an automotive interior trim manufacturing operation, and the addition of an aluminum extrusion tooling company. 

Each of the plastics and metals operations operated individually until 1996, at which time they united under one parent company, Gemini Group, Inc.  

The company is one of the largest employers in Huron County, Michigan, where it operates four plastics plants and three metals plants. Outside of Michigan, Gemini Group operates facilities in Muscle Shoals, Alabama, El Paso, Texas, and Saltillo, Mexico.

One of the former owners of Gemini Group, Bill Roberts, died on May 3, 2007.

Operations 
The Company is structured as follows:

Plastics divisions
 Valley Enterprises - Automotive Interior Trim
 Regency Plastics - Technical Blow Molding 
 Gemini Plastics, Inc. (GPI) - Plastic Extrusion & Coextrusion
 Sierra Plastics - Plastic Extrusion & Coextrusion
 Gemini Plastics de Mexico (GPM) - Plastic Extrusion & Coextrusion
 Thumb Plastics, Inc. (TPI) - Two-Shot & Multi-shot Injection Molding

Metals divisions
 Gemini Precision Machining, Inc. (GPMI) South - Production Machining (Formerly Axly)
 Gemini Precision Machining, Inc. (GPMI) North - Precision Machining (Formerly CKS)
 Briney Tooling Systems - Precision Toolholders
 Thumb Tool & Engineering (TTE) - Aluminum Extrusion Tooling
 Mid-South Central Extrusion Die (MSCED) - Aluminum Extrusion Tooling
 Consolidated Tool (CT) - Die Cast/Mold Tooling

Recognition from suppliers
In 2009, Johnson Controls presented Gemini Group with a Bronze 2009 Supplier Performance
Award. In 2007, Johnson Controls gave Gemini Group a Gold Supplier Performance Award and in 2006, a Silver award.

References

External links
 Official site

 Auto parts suppliers of the United States
Companies based in Michigan
Huron County, Michigan
Plastics companies of the United States
Metal companies of the United States